Milouš Kvaček  (19 November 1933 – 14 May 2010) was a Czech professional football player and manager who played for the Spartak Hradec Králové side that won the 1959–60 Czechoslovak First League title.

Playing career
Kvaček spent most of his playing career in the Czechoslovak First League, playing for FK Mladá Boleslav, Spartak Hradec Králové, TJ Jablonec nad Jisou and FC Slovan Liberec. He also had a brief spell playing in Australia for Sydney Prague. Overall, he appeared in 141 Czechoslovak First League matches and scored 52 league goals.

Career as manager
Following retirement as a player, he managed several clubs, including FK Mladá Boleslav in the second division in the 1975–76 season. He also led the Czechoslovakia Olympic football team, and also coached teams in Malaysia and Singapore. He led Kedah FA into two Malaysia Cup finals, winning the 1990 final.

In Singapore, he had a brief stint as national team coach in 1992 and also coached the Singapore Lions in Malaysia Cup. Kvacek also worked as a technical director for SAFFC in the S.League from 1996 to 1997.

Death
He died at the age of 76.

References

1933 births
2010 deaths
Czech footballers
Czechoslovak footballers
Křídla vlasti Olomouc players
FK Mladá Boleslav players
FC Hradec Králové players
FC Slovan Liberec players
FK Jablonec players
Czechoslovak football managers
Czech football managers
FK Mladá Boleslav managers
Kuala Lumpur City F.C. managers
Singapore national football team managers
Association football forwards
Perak F.C. managers
Kelantan FA managers